The 1985 Torneo Godó was a men's professional tennis tournament that took place on outdoor clay courts at the Real Club de Tenis Barcelona in Barcelona, Catalonia in Spain from 23 September until 29 September 1985. It was the 32nd edition of the tournament and was part of the 1984 Grand Prix circuit. Unseeded Thierry Tulasne won the singles title.

Finals

Singles
 Thierry Tulasne defeated  Mats Wilander, 0–6, 6–2, 3–6, 6–4, 6–0
 It was Tulasne's 3rd and last singles title of the year and the 4th of his career.

Doubles
 Sergio Casal /  Emilio Sánchez defeated  Jan Gunnarsson /  Michael Mortensen, 6–3, 6–3

References

External links
 Official tournament website
 ITF tournament edition details
 ATP tournament profile

Barcelona Open (tennis)
Torneo Godo
Torneo Godó
Torneo Godó